Aleksandr Vyacheslavovich Alekseyev (born 30 April 1981 in Tashkent, Uzbek SSR) is a professional cruiserweight boxer from Russia.

Amateur
Southpaw Alekseyev beat Jaroslavas Jakšto in the final of the World Military championships 2003.
He won a silver medal at the 2003 World Amateur Boxing Championships at 201 lbs losing to his nemesis Odlanier Solís.

Alekseyev won the gold medal in the same division at the 2004 European Amateur Boxing Championships in Pula, Croatia.

The  participated in the 2004 Summer Olympics. There he was narrowly defeated in the first round of the heavyweight (91 kg) division by Cuba's eventual winner Odlanier Solís.

He won a gold medal at the 2005 World Amateur Boxing Championships after Solís moved up in weight.

Amateur highlights 
 2002, 2003, 2005 Russian heavyweight champion
1999 won the Junior European Championship in Rijeka, Croatia, as a light heavyweight.
2002 won the Military World Championship in Curragh (Ireland) as a heavyweight, beating Dieter Roth (Germany) in the final by RSCO-2
2003 won the Military World Championship in  Catania (Italy), beating Jaroslavas Jakšto (Lithuania) in the final (28–8)
2003 2nd place at the World Championships in Bangkok, Thailand. Results were:
Defeated Shamsidin Arbobov (Tajikistan) RSCO-2
Defeated Raitis Ritenieks (Latvia) walkover
Defeated Steffen Kretschmann (Germany) RSCO-3
Lost to Odlanier Solís (Cuba) PTS (15–18)
2004 won the European Championship in Pula (Croatia), beating Victor Zuyev (Belarus) in the final.
2004 competed at the Athens Olympics. Result was:
Lost to Odlanier Solís (Cuba) PTS (21–24)
2005 won the World Championships in Mianyang, China. Results were:
Defeated Brad Pitt (Australia) RSCO
Defeated Zhenis Taumurinov (Kazakhstan) RSCO
Defeated Jozsef Darmos (Hungary) AB
Defeated Alexander Povernov (Germany) PTS (36–33)
Defeated Elchin Alizade (Azerbaijan) walkover

Professional
He turned pro in Germany as a cruiserweight in January 2006 and he defeated Tomáš Mrázek with a first-round knockout in his first fight.

Alekseyev won his first 16 pro fights, winning 15 by knockout, before suffering his first loss at the hands of Victor Emilio Ramírez in his 17th pro bout in January 2009.

He was slated to fight Garrett Wilson on 22 February 2013 in Galaţi, Romania, for the IBF cruiserweight title eliminator. Alekseyev won via unanimous decision becoming the mandatory for the IBF world title (currently held by Yoan Pablo Hernández).

The bout with Hernández took place on 23 November 2013 in Germany with the IBF cruiserweight title on the line. Alekseyev lost via tenth-round knockout.

Professional record

|-
|align="center" colspan=8|24 wins (20 knockouts), 3 losses, 1 draw
|-
|align=center style="border-style: none none solid solid; background: #e3e3e3"|Result
|align=center style="border-style: none none solid solid; background: #e3e3e3"|Record
|align=center style="border-style: none none solid solid; background: #e3e3e3"|Opponent
|align=center style="border-style: none none solid solid; background: #e3e3e3"|Type
|align=center style="border-style: none none solid solid; background: #e3e3e3"|Round
|align=center style="border-style: none none solid solid; background: #e3e3e3"|Date
|align=center style="border-style: none none solid solid; background: #e3e3e3"|Location
|align=center style="border-style: none none solid solid; background: #e3e3e3"|Notes
|-align=center
|Loss
|24–3-1
|align=left| Yoan Pablo Hernández
| KO || 10 
|2013-11-23 || align=left| Bamberg
|align=left| 
|-align=center
|Win
|24–2-1
|align=left| Garrett Wilson
| UD || 12 
|2013-02-22 || align=left| Galați
|align=left| 
|-align=center
|style="background:#abcdef;"|Draw
|23–2-1
|align=left| Firat Arslan
| MD || 12 
|2012-05-11 || align=left| Göppingen
|align=left| 
|-align=center
|Win
|23–2
|align=left| Enad Licina
| UD || 12 
|2012-02-04 || align=left| Frankfurt
|align=left| 
|-align=center
|Win
|22–2
|align=left| Daniel Bruwer
| TKO || 8 
|2011-11-18 || align=left| Cuxhaven
|align=left| 
|-align=center
|Win
|21–2
|align=left| Damian Norris
| TKO || 2 
|2011-06-11 || align=left| Hamburg
|align=left| 
|-align=center
|Win
|20–2
|align=left| DeAndrey Abron
| TKO || 6 
|2011-04-09 || align=left| Hamburg
|align=left| 
|-align=center
|Loss
|19–2
|align=left| Denis Lebedev
| KO || 2 
|2010-07-17 || align=left| Schwerin
|align=left| 
|-align=center
|Win
|19–1
|align=left| Daniel Ammann
| KO || 2 
|2009-12-19 || align=left| Schwerin
|align=left|
|-align=center
|Win
|18–1
|align=left| Kendrick Releford
| RTD || 3 
|2009-07-04 || align=left| Hamburg
|align=left|
|-align=center
|Won
|17–1
|align=left| Max Alexander
| UD || 10 
|2009-05-02 || align=left| Bremen
|align=left|
|-align=center
|Loss
|16–1
|align=left| Victor Emilio Ramírez
| RTD || 9 
|2009-01-17 || align=left| Düsseldorf
|align=left| 
|-align=center
|Won
|16–0
|align=left| Rob Calloway
| TKO || 3 
|2008-09-27 || align=left| Hamburg
|align=left|
|-align=center
|Won
|15–0
|align=left| Louis Azille
| TKO || 2 
|2008-05-31 || align=left| Düsseldorf
|align=left|
|-align=center
|Won
|14–0
|align=left| Talmadge Griffis
| RTD || 3 
|2008-02-23 || align=left| Halle, Saxony-Anhalt
|align=left|
|-align=center
|Won
|13–0
|align=left| Francisco Alvarez
| TKO || 4 
|2007-10-31 || align=left| San José
|align=left|
|-align=center
|Won
|12–0
|align=left| Darrin Humphrey
| TKO || 4 
|2007-09-15 || align=left| Rostock
|align=left|
|-align=center
|Won
|11–0
|align=left| Hector Alfredo Avila
| TKO || 1 
|2007-06-16 || align=left| Budapest
|align=left| 
|-align=center
|Won
|10–0
|align=left| John Anthony
| TKO || 5 
|2007-03-17 || align=left| Stuttgart
|align=left|
|-align=center
|Won
|9–0
|align=left| Henry Saenz
| TKO || 1 
|2007-02-27 || align=left| Cuxhaven
|align=left|
|-align=center
|Won
|8–0
|align=left| Lee Swaby
| TKO || 5 
|2006-12-02 || align=left| Berlin
|align=left|
|-align=center
|Won
|7–0
|align=left| Luis Oscar Ricail
| UD || 6 
|2006-10-28 || align=left| Stuttgart
|align=left|
|-align=center
|Won
|6–0
|align=left| Adrian Rajkai
| TKO || 3 
|2006-08-22 || align=left| Hamburg
|align=left|
|-align=center
|Won
|5–0
|align=left| Zoltán Béres
| TKO || 4 
|2006-07-25 || align=left| Hamburg
|align=left|
|-align=center
|Won
|4–0
|align=left| Vage Kocharyan
| TKO || 2 
|2006-05-23 || align=left| Ptuj
|align=left|
|-align=center
|Won
|3–0
|align=left| Oleksandr Subin
| TKO || 1 
|2006-04-08 || align=left| Kiel
|align=left|
|-align=center
|Won
|2–0
|align=left| Andrey Zaitsev
| TKO || 2 
|2006-03-11 || align=left| Hamburg
|align=left|
|-align=center
|Won
|1–0
|align=left| Tomáš Mrázek
| TKO || 1 
|2006-01-07 || align=left| Munich
|align=left|
|-align=center

References

External links
 
Yahoo! Sports
Alexander Alexeev on Fit-Equip Boxing Directory

1981 births
Living people
Heavyweight boxers
Boxers at the 2004 Summer Olympics
Olympic boxers of Russia
Sportspeople from Tashkent
Russian male boxers
AIBA World Boxing Championships medalists